Sir William Eliot (1586 – 7 December 1650) was an English politician who sat in the House of Commons  in 1640.

Eliot was the son of Lawrence Eliot of Busbridge, Surrey. He matriculated at Queen's College, Oxford on 15 October 1602 aged 15. He was a student of Middle Temple in 1605. He inherited the estate at Busbridge in 1618  and was knighted on 1 February 1621. 

In April 1640, Eliot was elected Member of Parliament for Haslemere in the Short Parliament. 
 
Eliot died in 1650 at the age of 64.

Eliot married Joan and had a son William.

References

1586 births
1650 deaths
English MPs 1640 (April)
Place of birth missing
Alumni of The Queen's College, Oxford
Members of the Middle Temple